Jim Criner (born March 30, 1940) is a former American football player and coach. Criner was also the head coach of the NFL Europe's Scottish Claymores from 1995 to 2000, and the short-lived XFL's Las Vegas Outlaws in 2001. Criner has also been head coach in the French league Ligue Élite de Football Américain.

Criner's 1980 Boise State team won the NCAA Division I-AA Championship and his Scottish Claymores squad won World Bowl IV in 1996. He was later a scout for the Kansas City Chiefs of the National Football League (NFL) under head coach Dick Vermeil, whom he assisted at UCLA from 1974 to 1975.

Early life and playing career
Born in Lurton, Arkansas, Criner was a four-sport athlete in California at Coachella Valley High School in Thermal. He attended Palo Verde Junior College, then transferred to Cal Poly in San Luis Obispo, where he played fullback.

Coaching career

High school football and college assistant coaching
Criner began his career as an assistant to Jim Hanifan at Charter Oak High School (1963), and then was an assistant under head coach Leonard Cohn at Claremont High School (1964) and then was head coach at Clovis High School.

Criner became a college assistant coach in 1967 at Utah, serving two seasons as the offensive line coach. In 1969, he became the defensive coordinator at Cal State Hayward. In 1970, he became the secondary coach at California for two seasons, and in 1972 moved to BYU for a season. He was the offensive line coach in 1973 at UCLA under Pepper Rodgers and continued under Dick Vermeil in 1974; he moved to linebackers coach in 1975, when UCLA won the Pac-8 title and upset top-ranked Ohio State 23–10 in the Rose Bowl.

Boise State
Following UCLA's Rose Bowl victory over Ohio State in January 1976, Criner was hired as the head coach at  replacing Tony Knap, who had departed  At the time, Boise State was a strong Division II program in the Big Sky Conference, and had won three consecutive conference titles. Criner's first contract at BSU was for one year at $24,200. The Broncos won the conference title again in his second season in 1977, and the conference moved up to the newly formed Division I-AA in 1978. Boise State went undefeated in conference in 1979, but were ineligible for the Big Sky title or the  they had been placed on probation for improper scouting late in the 1978 season.

Off of probation in 1980, Boise State won the Big Sky title with a  conference record, and advanced to the four-team I-AA playoffs, and defeated Grambling  in the first round (semifinals) in a  fog  The following week they traveled to Sacramento and defeated defending champion Eastern Kentucky  for the Division I-AA Championship.

Boise State again went 6–1 in conference in 1981, and tied for first with Idaho State in the Big Sky; both co-champions were invited to the expanded eight-team I-AA playoffs. The Broncos defeated Jackson State on the road, but were defeated at home in the semifinals by Eastern Kentucky. Idaho State won the 1981 national title, defeating EKU the following week in Texas.

Iowa State
Following the 1982 season at BSU, Criner became the 27th head coach at Iowa State University of the Big Eight Conference. He had a five-year contract for $58,000  but lasted only four seasons in Ames. He was fired from this position in November 1986, when the school announced the organization had made 34 allegations of wrongdoing in the football program. Allegations included coaches giving players cash as well as giving recruits rides and meals.

Aix-en-Provence Argonautes, France
Reached 2009 semi-final of French top level Ligue Élite de Football Américain league playoffs.

Amiens Spartiates (Spartans), France
2012 Ligue Élite de Football Américain league Champion with the Amiens Spartans, France

Personal life
Criner has three brothers and two sisters; all three of his brothers had prominent sports careers. His son Mark was his defensive coordinator in the XFL for the Las Vegas Outlaws and went on to coach at Cincinnati, Minnesota, and Middle Tennessee State among others. Grandson Calin Criner (b.1997) is a defensive back at Eastern Washington University

Head coaching record

College

XFL

Notes

References

External links
 Photos of Jim Criner from Boise State Library

1940 births
Living people
American football fullbacks
American football linebackers
BYU Cougars football coaches
Boise State Broncos football coaches
California Golden Bears football players
Cal Poly Mustangs football players
Cal State Hayward Pioneers football coaches
Iowa State Cyclones football coaches
Kansas City Chiefs scouts
Sacramento Surge coaches
Scottish Claymores coaches
UCLA Bruins football coaches
Utah Utes football coaches
Las Vegas Outlaws (XFL) coaches
High school football coaches in California
People from Newton County, Arkansas
Sportspeople from Riverside County, California
Coaches of American football from California
Players of American football from California
American expatriate players of American football
American expatriate sportspeople in France